Woman and Wife is a 1918 American silent drama film directed by Edward Jose and starring Alice Brady. It is based on the 1847 novel Jane Eyre by Charlotte Brontë. The Select Pictures Corporation produced and distributed the film. The film was also known as The Lifted Cross.

The film survives in an incomplete state at the BFI National Film and Television Archive.

Plot
As described in a film magazine, Jane Eyre (Brady) is sent to an orphan's home by her domineering aunt, and is expelled from that institution after she slaps the superintendent's face for trying to embrace her. She secures a position in the Rochester home as a governess for their only child. The lonesome Edward Rochester, believing his wife dead, proposes to Jane. His wife's brother appears, bringing along his demented sister, who is Edward's wife. He hides her in a room, and while the household is asleep the demented woman escapes and stabs Edward. Upon his recovery, the wedding proceeds, and at its height Edward's demented wife escapes from her room and interrupts the ceremony. Pursued by servants, she throws herself into a pool and drowns.

Cast

Alice Brady as Jane Eyre
Elliott Dexter as Edward Rochester
Helen Greene as Therese
Helen Lindroth as Grace Poole
Victor Benoit as Raoul Daquin
Leonora Morgan as Valerie Rochester
Madge Evans

Reception
Like many American films of the time, Woman and Wife was subject to cuts by city and state film censorship boards. For example, the Chicago Board of Censors required a cut in Reel 1 of the first scenes of the woman drinking.

References

External links

1918 films
American silent feature films
Films based on Jane Eyre
Films directed by Edward José
American black-and-white films
Silent American drama films
1918 drama films
Selznick Pictures films
1910s American films